Cyclone is a nickname for:

 Cy Young (1867-1955), American Hall-of-Fame baseball pitcher whose nickname "Cyclone" was shortened to "Cy"
 Cyclone Taylor (1884-1979), Canadian Hall-of-Fame hockey player
 Fabiano Aoki (born 1978), Brazilian kickboxer
 Cyclone Miller (1858-1916), American Major League Baseball pitcher
 Cyclone Ryan (1866-1917), Major League Baseball pitcher and first baseman for 12 games
 Cyclone Joe Williams (1886-1951), American baseball pitcher in the Negro leagues

See also 

 
 
 Hurricane (nickname)

Lists of people by nickname